Julia is an American television sitcom and the first weekly series to star an African-American woman in a non-stereotypical role. Previous television series featured African-American lead characters, but the characters were usually servants. The show starred actress and singer Diahann Carroll, and ran for 86 episodes on NBC from September 17, 1968, to March 23, 1971. The series was produced by Savannah Productions, Inc., Hanncarr Productions, Inc., and 20th Century-Fox Television.

During pre-production, the proposed series title was Mama's Man. The series was among the few situation comedies in the late 1960s that did not use a laugh track; however, 20th Century-Fox Television added one when the series was reissued for syndication and cable rebroadcasts in the late 1980s.

Julia was among the first acquisitions made by ASPiRE for its inaugural season in 2012.

Synopsis 

In Julia, Carroll played widowed single mother, Julia Baker (her husband, Army Capt. Baker, an O-1 Bird Dog artillery spotter pilot had been shot down in Vietnam), who was a nurse in a doctor's office at a large aerospace company. The doctor, Morton Chegley, was played by Lloyd Nolan, and Julia's romantic interests by Paul Winfield and Fred Williamson. Julia's son, Corey (Marc Copage) was approximately six to nine years old during the series run. He had barely known his father before he died. Corey's best friend was Earl J. Waggedorn, whom Corey almost always addressed and referred to precisely by his full name, though other characters (particularly his mother) would refer to him simply as Earl. The Waggedorns lived downstairs in the same apartment building, with father, police officer Leonard (Hank Brandt), stay-at-home mother Marie (Betty Beaird), and two sons, Earl and an infant whose first name is never revealed.

The first two seasons included nurse Hannah Yarby (Lurene Tuttle), who left to be married at the beginning of the third season, just as the clinic's manager, Brockmeyer, ordered downsizing — and removal of minorities from employment. (Chegley let Yarby go but kept Julia in defiance of the manager's edict. She was also kept after Chegley reminded Brockmeyer that such a move was a violation of the Civil Rights Act, which was just five years old at that point.) The second and third season included Richard (Richard Steele), a boy some one or two years older than Corey. Chegley's uncle, Dr. Norton Chegley (also played by Lloyd Nolan), made three appearances. The series' first episode was filmed in October 1967, a year before the pilot was picked up.

Cast 
 Diahann Carroll as Julia Baker
 Marc Copage as Corey Baker
 Betty Beaird as Marie Waggedorn
 Ned Glass as Sol Cooper (17 episodes, 1968–1970)
 Janear Hines as Roberta (1970–71)
 Eugene Jackson as Uncle Lou (1968–69)
 Michael Link as Earl J. Waggedorn
 Don Marshall as Ted Neumann (1968–70)
 Alison Susan Mills as Carol Deering
 Lloyd Nolan as Dr. Morton Chegley
 Mary Wickes as Melba Chegley (Dr. Chegley's wife)
 Steve Pendleton as Mr. Bennett (6 episodes, 1968–1970)
 Eddie Quillan as Eddie Edson (17 episodes, 1968–71)
 Lurene Tuttle as Nurse Hannah Yarby (32 episodes, 1968–70)
 Hank Brandt as Leonard Waggedorn (27 episodes, 1968–71)
 Fred Williamson as Steve Bruce (1970–71)
 Paul Winfield as Paul Cameron
 Diana Sands as Cousin Sarah Porter (1970-1971)

Controversy 
Though Julia is now remembered as being groundbreaking, during its run it was derided by critics for being apolitical and unrealistic. Diahann Carroll remarked in 1968: "At the moment we're presenting the white Negro. And he has very little Negroness." The Saturday Review's Robert Lewis Shayon wrote that Julia's "plush, suburban setting" was "a far, far cry from the bitter realities of Negro life in the urban ghetto, the pit of America's explosion potential." Gil Scott-Heron's "The Revolution Will Not Be Televised" refers to Julia in the same breath as Bullwinkle, implying that the character was something of a cartoon. Ebony published a somewhat more supportive assessment of the program: "As a slice of Black America, Julia does not explode on the TV screen with the impact of a ghetto riot. It is not that kind of show. Since the networks have had a rash of shows dealing with the nation's racial problems, the light-hearted Julia provides welcome relief, if, indeed, relief is even acceptable in these troubled times." The series also came under criticism from African-American viewers for its depiction of a fatherless Black family due to the father's death in American military service. Excluding a Black male lead, it was argued, "rendered the series safer" and "less likely to grapple with issues that might upset white viewers."

Nielsen ratings

Cancellation 
Julia was well-rated in the first two seasons but dropped out of the top 30 most-watched shows during season 3. The series was canceled in 1971, reportedly because of Carroll's and series creator and executive producer Hal Kanter's desire to work on other projects. Kanter created and produced The Jimmy Stewart Show for NBC the following season.

Awards and nominations

References

External links 

 

1968 American television series debuts
1971 American television series endings
1960s American black sitcoms
1970s American black sitcoms
1960s American medical television series
English-language television shows
NBC original programming
Television series about widowhood
Television series by 20th Century Fox Television
Television shows set in Los Angeles